is a Japanese singer. Along with composer, record producer and DJ Yasutaka Nakata, she is the lead vocalist of the electronica band Capsule, which she formed in 1997 with Nakata when they were both 17. Their formal debut came in 2001 with the release of the single "Sakura". Two more singles and their debut album, High Collar Girl, followed the same year.

Koshijima has worked exclusively as part of Capsule since the group's inception, acting as lead vocalist for all of the band's fifteen albums to date.

External links 
  

1980 births
Japanese electronic musicians
Japanese women pop singers
Living people
People from Kanazawa, Ishikawa
Musicians from Ishikawa Prefecture
Japanese women in electronic music
21st-century Japanese singers
21st-century Japanese women singers